The Kim Koo Museum is a museum in Seoul, South Korea which opened on October 22, 2002 (21 years ago), to commemorate the life and thoughts of Kim Koo, a Korean independence activist against the Japanese occupation of Korea. This museum and library is located within Hyochang Park in Hyochang-dong, Yongsan-gu, Seoul.

See also
List of museums in South Korea

References

External links
Official site

Buildings and structures in Yongsan District
Museums in Seoul
Biographical museums in South Korea
Museums established in 2002
2002 establishments in South Korea